Calihuala  is a town and municipality in Oaxaca in south-western Mexico. The municipality covers an area of  km². 

References

Municipalities of Oaxaca